Cerro Doña Inés is a mountain in the Andes of Chile. It has a height of 5070 metres.

See also
List of mountains in the Andes

Dona Ines